Morris is an extinct town in Kanawha County, West Virginia.

References 

Ghost towns in West Virginia
Geography of Kanawha County, West Virginia